James Thomas Walford (1833–1908) was an English ecclesiastical architect.

Personal
Walford was born in Marylebone, London in 1833.  His parents were James and Maria Walford. He married Priscilla Ann Waud in 1855.  They moved to Scotland to live in Portobello in the late 1800s. They lived at No. 29 Joppa Road, Portobello.  He died on 15 October 1908.

Work
He was involved in the design of a number of churches in England and Scotland.  These included the London Oratory, the Church of St. Alban, Leeds  which is now demolished, and St John the Evangelist RC Church, Portobello

References

1833 births
1908 deaths
19th-century English architects
Architects of Roman Catholic churches
English ecclesiastical architects
English Roman Catholics
Gothic Revival architects
19th-century architects
Architects from London